The 2015–16 NBA season was the Phoenix Suns' 48th season in the NBA. It was their first season where the Suns played in the Talking Stick Resort Arena with its new name, having played there since the 1992–93 season, when it used to be called the America West Arena and then later on, the U.S. Airways Center.

Key dates
 May 19, 2015: The NBA draft lottery took place.
 May 29, 2015: The Suns reassigned assistant coach Mark West's back into the front office as a director of player relations, promoted Corey Gaines as a full-time assistant coach again, hired Bakersfield Jam coach Nate Bjorkgren as a new assistant coach for player development, fired Kenny Gattison as an assistant coach by not renewing his contract, and fired director of player personnel John Treloar.
 June 3, 2015: Former NBA player and Austin Spurs assistant coach Earl Watson was announced as one of the newest player development assistant coaches.
 June 10, 2015: President of Basketball Operations Lon Babby announced that after his free agency stint in July, he would step down from his position and take on a new role as a senior adviser.
 June 17, 2015: Danny Granger exercised his player option with the team so he could play out the rest of his contract.
 June 25, 2015: The 2015 NBA draft took place at the Barclays Center in Brooklyn, New York; Phoenix selects Kentucky University's shooting guard Devin Booker with their 13th pick and trades their 44th pick (Kentucky University's Andrew Harrison) to the Memphis Grizzlies in exchange for back-up power forward Jon Leuer.
 June 27, 2015: Phoenix announces that former Villanova University player and Austin Spurs assistant coach Jason Fraser accepted the last open player development assistant coach role for the team.
 June 30, 2015: The Morris twins complete their first mandated court appearance after their situation with Eric Hood in January this past season. They were projected to meet again on August 3, 2015 in Arizona.
 July 1, 2015: The NBA free agency period began; Brandon Knight agreed to a 5-year, $70 million offer that was hinted earlier on in June to stay with the Suns; Dallas Mavericks center Tyson Chandler also agreed to be in Phoenix as well for a 4-year, $52 million offer.
 July 2, 2015: The Suns traded small forwards Marcus Morris, Danny Granger, and Reggie Bullock to the Detroit Pistons in exchange for the Pistons' 2020 second round selection.
 July 8, 2015: Phoenix acquired CSKA Moscow shooting guard Sonny Weems on a two-year deal (second year being a team option) worth a total of $5.8 million; Phoenix also got point guard Ronnie Price back on a one-year deal worth $1.5 million.
 July 9, 2015: Teams could sign, trade, extend, and even release players to their own accord, such as signing Tyson Chandler on his contract; Phoenix also agreed to a one-year deal worth $5.5 million with Brooklyn Nets power forward Mirza Teletović after he was released from them.
 July 17, 2015: The Suns re-signed point guard Brandon Knight and signed power forward Mirza Teletović and guards Sonny Weems and Ronnie Price; Phoenix also waived point guard Jerel McNeal's contract before it became fully guaranteed, even though the Suns' Summer League wasn't over yet.
 July 19, 2015: T. J. Warren earned All-NBA First Team Las Vegas Summer League Honors for his performance during the 2015 NBA Summer League.
 July 23, 2015: News was leaked that the Suns would reveal a new black alternate jersey for road matches only. Further information also revealed that the Suns would get a flexible, updated silhouette for a different alternative jersey.
 July 30, 2015: The Suns announced changes to their coaching staff and front office that includes the recent announcement of Bakersfield Jam general manager Bubba Barrage as the team's newest Director of Player Personnel and Antonio Williams as the newest scout, replacing the initial scouting role held by Ronnie Lester.
 August 1, 2015: Lon Babby stepped down from his old president of basketball operations role and took on the team's senior adviser role; Ryan McDonough then took on that role as well.
 August 3, 2015: Markieff Morris and his traded brother were scheduled to return to Phoenix to complete their second mandated court appearance with the Eric Hood case. However, neither brother showed up and their attorneys asked for their court appearance that day to be waived. As a result, their next pre-trial conference was delayed to September 16, 2015.
 August 12, 2015: The NBA announced all team schedules for the 2015–16 season, with the Suns opening their season on October 28, 2015 against the Dallas Mavericks, Tyson Chandler's former team.
 August 24, 2015: The Suns announced that they would put their superstar point guard Steve Nash into the Phoenix Suns Ring of Honor on their October 30, 2015 game against the Portland Trail Blazers, which was also rookie Devin Booker's 19th birthday.
 September 8, 2015: The Phoenix Suns revealed their newest black alternate jerseys, updated their orange alternate jersey, revealed their updated court design (with the main feature showcasing that the team replaced the "SUNS" ambigram with their old Sunburst logo similar to what they had during the 1990s), and unveiled their new Civic Pride "We Are PHX" movement to the media. The event included Kentucky University alumni Eric Bledsoe, rookie Devin Booker, Archie Goodwin, and Brandon Knight, as well as small forward P. J. Tucker, the newly acquired power forward Jon Leuer, coach Jeff Hornacek, Suns president Jason Rowley, and Phoenix mayor Greg Stanton; the league also fines Markieff Morris $10,000 due to his trade demand comments he's made throughout the past month or two.
 September 16, 2015: The Morris twins requested a new grand jury as a new mandated appearance after missing their August meeting. Both sides had to have written arguments for and against a new grand jury to precise over the twins' case. Their next meeting took place on October 15, 2015, although neither appeared in court due to their respective obligations to the Suns and Pistons. If their request was denied, the earliest next court date could be November 5, 2015; otherwise, the case was be held back all the way until May 31, 2016. The Suns' signing of Cory Jefferson (and other training camp invitees) became official that day.
 September 28, 2015: The deadline for all signed players to report to their teams took effect as training camp commenced in Flagstaff; Markieff Morris was the last player to show up for the team when everyone else had been training with each other for at least two weeks.
 October 3, 2015: The Suns concluded their training camp practices before the start of the pre-season by having a friendly match between themselves at the Veterans Memorial Coliseum. Team MacLeod barely beat out Team Cotton by the final of 67–66.
 October 26, 2015: The player options of center Alex Len, shooting guard Archie Goodwin, and small forward T. J. Warren get picked up for the 2016–17 NBA season.
 October 28, 2015: The Suns started the regular season with a home game against Tyson Chandler's former team, the Dallas Mavericks; Devin Booker made his debut as the first player in the NBA at 18 years old who also had at least one year of college experience.
 October 30, 2015: Steve Nash became the 10th player to enter the Phoenix Suns Ring of Honor during the second home game of the season against the Portland Trail Blazers; Devin Booker turns 19 years old during the team's first victory of the season.
 November 25, 2015: The Suns sign Tucson, Arizona native Bryce Cotton on a one-year deal after injuries to back-up point guard Ronnie Price, as well as to starting point guard Eric Bledsoe occurred earlier in the season.
 December 15, 2015: The starting point for signed free agents to be traded to different teams commences.
 December 26, 2015: Eric Bledsoe tore his left meniscus and is out for the rest of the season.
 December 27, 2015: The Suns fired assistant coaches Jerry Sichting and Mike Longabardi for their poor performances throughout the month of December.
 January 5, 2016: Teams can sign players for 10-day contracts.
 January 6, 2016: After winning their first game of the new year, the Suns decided to waive away the non-guaranteed deals of Cory Jefferson and Bryce Cotton.
 January 7, 2016: The Suns signed Lorenzo Brown, former college teammate of T. J. Warren's, to a 10-day contract.
 January 15, 2016: Contracts for players signed earlier in free agency for teams over the salary cap are now fully guaranteed for the season.
 January 18, 2016: The Suns re-signed Lorenzo Brown to his second 10-day contract.
 January 21, 2016: Phoenix re-signed former Suns player Cory Jefferson to a 10-day contract after all of the previous power forwards wound up injured.
 January 23, 2016: In a close 98–95 victory over the Atlanta Hawks, Tyson Chandler became the first Phoenix Suns player to record multiple games of 20+ rebounds with the team, tied Paul Silas' record for rebounds in one game with 27, and set a new offensive rebounding record with 13, beating out both Charles Barkley and Curtis Perry there in the process.
 January 28, 2016: The Suns decided to not sign Lorenzo Brown for the entire year, instead giving Jordan McRae (who held the highest-scoring effort in D-League history) a 10-day contract.
 February 1, 2016: Head coach Jeff Hornacek was fired after a generally awful season and replaced by assistant coach Earl Watson for the rest of the season; Bob Hill (a former head coach for the San Antonio Spurs and Seattle SuperSonics) took the vacant assistant coach role left by Watson; rookie Devin Booker was announced as a participant for the three-point shootout.
 February 2, 2016: Before the beginning of Phoenix's 7-game home stand (9 in 10 games) in February, it was announced that small forward T. J. Warren would be out for the rest of the season due to a broken foot he had sustained during a game against the Cleveland Cavaliers in January.
 February 5, 2016: The Suns signed Orlando Johnson to a 10-day contract days after finding out small forward T. J. Warren would be out for the rest of the season.
 February 8, 2016: Phoenix re-signed Jordan McRae to his second 10-day contract moving forward.
 February 10, 2016: Devin Booker was announced as a participant for All-Star Friday's NBA Cares Special Olympics Unified Basketball Game.
 February 11, 2016: It was announced, a day before the actual event began, that rookie Devin Booker was a contestant for the Rising Stars Challenge after Philadelphia 76ers sophomore power forward/center Nerlens Noel injured himself before the event took place.
 February 12, 2016: The NBA All-Star Weekend taking place in Toronto, Ontario, Canada began.
 February 18, 2016: The NBA trade deadline takes full effect; Phoenix traded away Markieff Morris to the Washington Wizards in exchange for DeJuan Blair, Kris Humphries, a top-9-protected first-round draft pick, and a $1.56 million traded player exception; the Suns also waived Orlando Johnson to make room for their newest players.
 February 20, 2016: The Suns signed former Philadelphia 76ers and Idaho Stampede point guard Phil Pressey to a 10-day contract after deciding not to sign Jordan McRae for the rest of the year.
 February 22, 2016: The Suns waived DeJuan Blair.
 February 24, 2016: The Suns signed former Dallas Mavericks shooting guard John Jenkins to a three-year contract (two years non-guaranteed) two days after deciding to waive DeJuan Blair from the roster.
 February 28, 2016: After getting their only victory in the month of February, the Suns decided to buy out Kris Humphries' contract (the other player acquired in the Markieff Morris trade) that he first signed with the Washington Wizards in order for it to not affect their salary cap.
 March 1, 2016: The Suns re-signed Phil Pressey to his second 10-day contract.
 March 5, 2016: After winning their first road game of the season since December 7, 2015, against the Chicago Bulls with a blowout win against the Orlando Magic, the Suns waived Sonny Weems due to his poor performances throughout the season.
 March 6, 2016: The road victories the Suns recorded against the Orlando Magic two nights ago and the Memphis Grizzlies that night were exactly a year since the Suns last won two straight games on the road on March 4 and March 6, 2015.
 March 8, 2016: After winning their second game in a row by beating the Memphis Grizzlies on the road, the Suns signed former Indiana Pacers and Arizona Wildcats small forward Chase Budinger and former California–Santa Barbara Gauchos and Qingdao DoubleStar Eagles center and Phoenix, Arizona, native Alan Williams to a one-year deal and a 10-day contract respectively.
 March 11, 2016: The Suns decided not to sign Phil Pressey for the rest of the season after finding out Brandon Knight was healthy enough to return to action for the season.
 March 18, 2016: Phoenix native Alan Williams signed for the rest of the season, with an option to play for the Suns next season and also participate in their Summer League team after this season.
 April 1, 2016: Brandon Knight was announced out for the rest of the season due to a sports hernia he reaggravated on his debut as a road opponent against his former team, the Milwaukee Bucks, after trying to dunk on Giannis Antetokounmpo. He was fouled on the play in question.
 April 5, 2016: Forward Mirza Teletović broke the record set by former San Antonio Spurs' Chuck Person at the time during the 1994–95 season to make the most three-pointers as a reserve player with his 165th three-pointer during a loss against the Atlanta Hawks. He finished the season with 179 three-pointers off the bench.
 April 8, 2016: Brandon Knight had surgery on his hernia in Philadelphia.
 April 9, 2016: Rookie Devin Booker recorded his 1,000th point with 10:51 left in the first quarter during a 121–100 blowout victory over the New Orleans Pelicans, thus becoming the fourth-youngest player to record 1,000 points in a season, the third-youngest to do it in his rookie season, and the sixth-overall player to record 1,000 points as a teenager.
 April 11, 2016: It was announced that the Phoenix Suns would take full control over their D-League affiliate team, the Bakersfield Jam, and move them into the Prescott Valley Event Center in Prescott Valley, Arizona as the Northern Arizona Suns, starting after this season ended. The Suns thereby became one of 19 NBA teams (as of this season) to have complete control over a single D-League affiliate team.
 April 19, 2016: The Suns announced that Earl Watson was no longer the interim head coach, and was the full-time head coach for the next three years, effective this new season.
 May 16, 2016: Devin Booker was voted fourth in the NBA Rookie of the Year Award voting segment, finishing behind Nikola Jokić, Kristaps Porziņģis, and his former college teammate Karl-Anthony Towns.
 May 19, 2016: Booker was announced as a part of the NBA All-Rookie First Team, joining Towns, Porziņģis, Jokić, and the Philadelphia 76ers' Jahlil Okafor. Booker also became the first Suns rookie to join an All-Rookie team (either first or second) since Amar'e Stoudemire in 2003, when he also won the NBA Rookie of the Year Award.

Offseason

Draft picks

The Phoenix Suns have only one first round pick and one second round pick this season. Their sole first round pick was their own that was also a part of the NBA draft lottery. The Suns initially had two other draft picks as well (one from the Minnesota Timberwolves and the other from the Los Angeles Lakers, both of which were coincidentally the top picks of this season's draft), but they were both involved with trades the Suns made last season. Minnesota's first round pick (which had lottery protections this season) was traded to the Boston Celtics, where Phoenix got center Brandan Wright in exchange. However, the Lakers' pick (which was top 5 protected this season) was moved in the trade deadline extravaganza of 2015, with Phoenix gaining guard Brandon Knight from the Milwaukee Bucks (as well as other players and future first round draft picks) in exchange for Milwaukee gaining the Suns' center Miles Plumlee and then-rookie point guard Tyler Ennis, as well as the Philadelphia 76ers' point guard Michael Carter-Williams, and Philadelphia getting the Lakers' protected first round pick out of it. The lone second round pick they have is also the pick they had on their own accord in spite of having a declining record when compared to two seasons ago in the process.

With the 13th pick, the Suns selected shooting guard Devin Booker from Kentucky University. Booker averaged 10 points off of 47% overall shooting, 2 rebounds, and 1.1 assists during 21.5 minutes of play in Kentucky's near-undefeated season as a bench player. As a result, Booker became the Southeastern Conference's Sixth Man of the Year for, and made it to the All-SEC Second Team and the SEC All-Freshmen Team. Despite coming off the bench during his college season, Booker was the most immediately successful rookie the Suns drafted (and was kept by them) in over a decade, not only finishing fourth in the NBA Rookie of the Year Award voting, but also being the first Suns rookie to make it to any All-Rookie team since 2003. With the 44th pick, the Suns selected another player from the University of Kentucky, point guard Andrew Harrison. However, the Suns traded Harrison's rights to the Memphis Grizzlies for power forward Jon Leuer. As the starting point guard with the Wildcats for two seasons, Harrison had averaged 10.1 points, 3.8 assists, and 2.7 rebounds, but his output decreased during his second season, and was considered a likely reason for Harrison's drop from being a considered first-round talent to falling around the middle of the second round. Another player that the Suns got, who had entered the 2015 NBA draft via graduation, but wasn't drafted, was Phoenix native Alan Williams, an undersized center/power forward from the University of California, Santa Barbara.  He was well known for his rebounding abilities, to the point where he earned best rebounding numbers in not just college at his junior and senior years (even winning the Big West's Player of the Year as a junior), but also was the leading rebounder in China for the Qingdao DoubleStar Eagles.

Free agency

Players Brandan Wright, Gerald Green, and Marcus Thornton; as well as the returning Earl Barron all became unrestricted free agents as of the end of the 2014–15 NBA season. In addition, combo guard Brandon Knight ended up being a restricted free agent. Small forward Danny Granger was also considered a candidate for unrestricted free agency, but he ended up exercising his player option to take on his final year of his contract for the rest of this season on June 17, 2015. Not only that, but one recent trade the Suns made by trading their most recent second round selection to Memphis for power forward Jon Leuer was fully guaranteed for the rest of the season after having his rights remain with the team after June 29, 2015. Point guard Jerel McNeal also had a team option that would make him an unrestricted free agent, but it had to be decided upon and met before July 21, 2015, which was around the time Phoenix's Summer League campaign ended and a good portion of free agency had been completed. However, unlike the other players that had team options with the Suns, McNeal was waived four days before his contract was guaranteed, on July 17, 2015 during the Summer League, due to his less than stellar performance there.

To start their free agency push, the Suns decided to lock down their biggest trade deadline piece last season, Brandon Knight, to a 5-year deal worth $70 million (the same deal offered to point guard Eric Bledsoe a year earlier) on July 1, 2015. In addition to keeping Brandon Knight, the Suns also signed up 2011 NBA Finals champion center Tyson Chandler on exactly the same day. The signing of Tyson came in conjecture to the Suns' personal meeting with Portland Trail Blazers free agent power forward LaMarcus Aldridge as well for the chance to lure him over to Phoenix. In the meantime, Brandan Wright was lost to the Memphis Grizzlies when he signed a 3-year deal worth $18 million. A day later, the Suns traded small forwards Marcus Morris, Danny Granger, and Reggie Bullock to the Detroit Pistons in exchange for the Pistons' 2020 second round selection. This move was considered a way for Phoenix to sign LaMarcus Aldridge without taking any hits on their salary cap; unfortunately for the Suns, on July 4, Aldridge instead decided to go to the rival San Antonio Spurs.

After failing to sign Aldridge, the Suns decided to sign CSKA Moscow shooting guard Sonny Weems to a two-year deal worth $5.8 million (with a team option on the second year) and former 2011–12 Phoenix Suns point guard Ronnie Price on a one-year deal worth $1.5 million (the veteran's minimum) on July 8, 2015. A day later, it was announced that the Brooklyn Nets' power forward Mirza Teletović from the nation of Bosnia & Herzegovina would sign a one-year deal worth $5.5 million, while Gerald Green would sign a one-year deal worth $3 million with the Miami Heat. Four days after the July moratorium ended, the Suns' Marcus Thornton, who they got after their trade with Isaiah Thomas signed a one-year, veteran's minimum deal with the Houston Rockets. On July 31, it was revealed that Jerel McNeal would sign to play for Aris Thessaloniki in Greece instead. After that, on September 25, 2015, center Earl Barron signed a training camp deal to play with the Atlanta Hawks Basketball Club after former Suns player Jason Richardson announced his retirement due to an injury that he feared put his health at risk, although Barron played for the Fubon Braves in Taiwan on November 17, 2015 after failing to make their regular season rotation.

On August 20, 2015, the Suns agreed to training camp deals with former Ole Miss and Yenisey Krasnoyarsk shooting guard Terrico White and former Harvard and Helios Suns Domžale small forward Kyle Casey. Five days afterwards, the Suns also decided to add former Philadelphia 76ers center Henry Sims and former Brooklyn Nets power forward Cory Jefferson towards their training camp roster as more likely potential additions to the team, as well as former Nevada Wolf Pack and Ratiopharm Ulm point guard Deonte Burton. However, all of those signings were not official until September 16, 2015. Burton did not train with the team at all and instead became the first player to be cut on October 3, 2015, which was before the team's scrimmage at the Veterans Memorial Coliseum. After that, the Suns waived both Terrico White and Kyle Casey from their roster on October 15, 2015, two days after their overtime loss to the Houston Rockets. Finally, on October 24, 2015, the Suns decided to waive Henry Sims from the roster and sign last year's Mr. Irrelevant Cory Jefferson to a non-guaranteed deal for the season. All waived players except for Henry Sims later joined the Bakersfield Jam. Sims joined the Grand Rapids Drive on November 12, 2015 instead. However, of all the players there that were training camp invites, only Sims found his way back into the NBA again, signing a deal to play with the Brooklyn Nets on March 17, 2016.

On November 25, 2015, the Suns signed Tucson, Arizona native Bryce Cotton to a one-year deal as insurance in the event either Ronnie Price or Eric Bledsoe were out of commission. He made his debut over a month later due to an injury involving Eric Bledsoe. Cotton previously played point guard for the Austin Spurs in the D-League (twice) and the Utah Jazz before signing his deal to play for the Suns. On January 6, 2016, after winning at home against the Charlotte Hornets, the Suns decided to waive both Cory Jefferson and Bryce Cotton's non-guaranteed deals. To make up for these moves, they announced that Grand Rapids Drive point guard Lorenzo Brown signed a 10-day contract to determine his future value to the team, especially as a backup point guard since Bledsoe was out for the rest of the season. Brown performed well enough to sign a second 10-day contract, especially with Ronnie Price out around that timeline. On January 21, 2016, the Suns decided to have Jefferson return to the roster for a 10-day contract due to the team's power forwards all being out of commission during the January 19 game against the Indiana Pacers. However, on January 28, 2016, Phoenix decided to sign former Philadelphia 76ers selection Jordan McRae to a 10-day contract in order to replace Lorenzo Brown after his second 10-day contract expired. In the meantime, the Suns decided to not extend Cory Jefferson's deal (again) after most of the team's power forwards returned healthy on January 31, 2016.

During Jordan McRae's first 10-day stint, Phoenix decided to sign another 10-day contract out for former NBA and Austin Spurs player Orlando Johnson on a 10-day contract on February 5, 2016 due to the season-ending injury of T. J. Warren earlier in the month of February. After trading Markieff Morris away to the Washington Wizards, the Suns decided to both waive Orlando Johnson's 10 day contract and let go of Jordan McRae after his second 10-day contract expired in order to replace them with former Philadelphia 76ers and Idaho Stampede point guard Phil Pressey for 10 days, starting on February 20, 2016. Furthermore, after waiving DeJuan Blair from the roster, the Suns decided to sign former Dallas Mavericks shooting guard John Jenkins to a 3-year contract (two years non-guaranteed) on February 24, 2016. In addition, they waived Kris Humphries (from their Markieff Morris trade) and one of their recent free-agent signings in Sonny Weems on February 28 and March 5, 2016 respectively. To replace Weems, though, the Suns decided to sign former Indiana Pacers and Arizona Wildcats forward Chase Budinger for the rest of the season on March 8, 2016. Furthermore, on the same day, the Suns signed former Qingdao DoubleStar Eagles and California–Santa Barbara Gauchos center/power forward Alan Williams (a Phoenix, Arizona native) to a 10-day contract to replace Humphries in case either Alex Len or Tyson Chandler got injured again. While Phil Pressey did not sign with the team for the rest of the season due to the return of Brandon Knight as the starting point guard on March 11 (even after Knight had his own season-ending injury later on), Alan Williams got to sign for not just the rest of this season, but also the next season on March 18, 2016, thus finally ending the Suns' free agency spree that season.

The Morris twins situation

For a majority of the past two seasons, many of the problems the team had there as a whole were projected by many fans as problems relating to that of the Morris twins' behaviors (primarily the behavior of Markieff Morris for this season). Before the start of the season, both Markieff and his twin brother Marcus Morris were subject to many problems both on and off the court, from behaving poorly in front of (now former) head coach Jeff Hornacek to getting multiple technical fouls (some of which occurred in costly situations that season) to calling out the team's fanbase for not stepping up properly to even having an upcoming court case involving a former mentor of theirs named Erik Hood. In an attempt to help cool down the problem earlier on before this season began, the Suns decided to trade what was considered (at the time) the lesser-talented twin brother (Marcus) alongside their influx of small forwards in Reggie Bullock and Danny Granger to the Detroit Pistons on July 2, 2015, in exchange for a 2020 second round draft pick in what was seen as an effort to open up cap space to lure LaMarcus Aldridge away from both the Portland Trail Blazers and the San Antonio Spurs. When that failed, Marcus started lambasting the team's front office and fans for not inquiring with them about the oncoming trade when it happened. Furthermore, it was revealed that on August 3, 2015, both of the Morris twins failed to show up for the pretrial conference that was set for them on that date, which forced the judicial system to delay the case until September 16, 2015. The twins' trail continued well beyond this season, and to the next when they requested a new grand jury, and then having the trial be further delayed to gather evidence on the text messages sent between Eric Hood and Thomasine "Angel" Morris, the other victim in question. The twins' trial continued until October 3, 2017, due to their conflicting schedules as NBA players on different teams by that point in time, where the judge deemed the twins (and former Baltimore Ravens safety Gerald Bowman) not guilty for the attack on Hood due to his story changing from both of the twins being involved in attacking him to just Marcus attacking him, while the other two attackers involved (Julius Kane & Christopher Melendez Jr.) admitted their guilt in the attack earlier on back in September 2017. Nevertheless, the trial's results would not change the fates of the twins after the July trade involving Marcus Morris.

On August 11, 2015, Markieff Morris revealed to The Philadelphia Inquirer that he wanted to be traded out of Phoenix, mainly due to how he and his twin brother were notified of the news of the Detroit Pistons trade on July 2, 2015, where Markieff's brother was traded alongside Reggie Bullock and Danny Granger for the Pistons' 2020 second round selection. He was fined $10,000 for his comments. Four days later, he stated his preference to play for either the Houston Rockets (Marcus' original team) or the Toronto Raptors, but he wouldn't mind any other location like the Washington Wizards as well. However, the Suns decided to counter Markieff's demands by saying they would not trade him due to his importance to the team around that time. Despite that notion, he remained adamant about his decision by posting out on his Twitter account that his future would not be in Phoenix, just a day after the Suns wished Markieff a happy 26th birthday, and continued with the attitude a week later saying he won't accept any apologies from the team. At the end of the offseason, though, Markieff remained on the team throughout most of the season, with Marcus continuing to bash the team and their fanbase along the way as a Detroit Pistons player, even claiming he was never really a Phoenix Suns player. It was later revealed that the Suns had tried to work out a trade involving Markieff for eight months before it was finally completed in February, with general manager Ryan McDonough stating that if a better deal for Markieff had come before the start of the season, it would have been done by then. The problem was stated that Markieff himself didn't do the team any favors throughout the majority of the season between his court case with his brother and worries that the behavior he had at the start of the season there would continue for other teams afterwards.

While Markieff suggested that he had learned from the mistakes he made during the summertime, he continued to have problems with the team and even struggled with his performance after his first ever injury as a player in the middle of November. After his injury, Markieff was relegated to a bench role, with times that he didn't even play at all for various reasons. His performance dropped even further from averaging around 13 points and 5 rebounds in 27 minutes of action in November to 6.4 points and 2.9 rebounds in 17 minutes of action in December, with Jon Leuer replacing Markieff at points. It soon reached a point on December 23, 2015 against the Denver Nuggets (which was also the last full game Eric Bledsoe played before a season-ending knee injury three days later) where Markieff threw a towel (accidentally) at head coach Jeff Hornacek after being frustrated at a play. The incident drew parallels to when former Suns player Robert Horry threw a towel at former Suns head coach Danny Ainge back in the 1996–97 Phoenix Suns season. Like Horry, Morris was suspended for two games without pay. However, unlike the Horry situation, Markieff remained with the team for not just the rest of December, but also for the entirety of January and halfway through February. Markieff also ended up lasting longer than Hornacek and two of his top assistants, Jerry Sichting and Mike Longabardi (the latter of which won the 2016 NBA Finals championship later on in the season with the Cleveland Cavaliers). It also caused the Suns to stop playing Markieff altogether for a good amount of time, only relenting with all of their power forwards starting to get injuries during the month of January at certain points.

When head coach Jeff Hornacek was fired on February 1, 2016, and assistant(/former player development) coach Earl Watson replaced him as interim head coach for the rest of the season, Watson tried to designate Markieff as the team's newest leader after having injuries decimate their entire roster. During the five games Morris held that designation, he recorded his best averages for the Suns with 20.7 points, 7.6 rebounds, and 4.6 assists in over 30 minutes of action, even though the team did not win any of those games around that period of time. However, the breaking point for Markieff and the Suns came under Morris' last game on February 9, 2016 against the defending champion Golden State Warriors, where during the first timeout of the game in the first quarter, Markieff went after his teammate Archie Goodwin due to Goodwin not performing well at the time. While the Suns lost a relatively close match to the Warriors, they soon realized that enough was enough with Markieff (and later Goodwin), and then asked to have a first round draft pick and a young player in return for Markieff to go far away from their franchise forever. At the end of the February 18, 2016 trade deadline, despite him wanting to stay with the team by then, the other Morris brother was traded to the Washington Wizards in exchange for power-forward/center combo players DeJuan Blair and Kris Humphries, as well as a top-9 protected 2016 first round draft pick and a $1.56 million traded player exception. Four days after the trade, though, the Suns waived Blair. To replace him, the Suns decided to use their traded player exception to sign John Jenkins to a three-year contract (with the second and third years being non-guaranteed) for the league minimum. Furthermore, the Suns also decided to buy out Kris Humphries' contract that he had for two more years (including this one) on February 28, 2016 in order to help get him to a playoff team in the Atlanta Hawks, while also replacing Humphries with Phoenix, Arizona native Alan Williams to a 10-day contract on March 8, 2016, and then for the rest of the season on March 18, 2016. Both the first round pick from Markieff (which became Georgios Papagiannis) and the 2020 second round pick from Marcus (which eventually became Xavier Tillman) were later traded to the Sacramento Kings as part of a deal in exchange for Marquese Chriss, who was the 8th pick in the 2016 NBA draft.

Coaching changes
On May 29, 2015, it was announced that assistant coach Kenny Gattison was leaving the team and former Phoenix Mercury coach and Suns player development coach Corey Gaines was to be promoted to full-time assistant coach again. At the same time, it was announced that Bakersfield Jam coach Nate Bjorkgren was Corey's replacement as player development coach (as well as being an assistant head coach in his own accord) and Mark West was relegated back into the front office as a director of player relations. Several days later, former NBA player and Austin Spurs assistant coach Earl Watson was announced as assistant coach duties. Joe Smith was also announced as a potential candidate for another player development assistant coach position. However, on June 27, 2015 — two days after the 2015 NBA draft — the Suns hired former Villanova University player and director of student-athlete development, Harlem Globetrotter, and Austin Spurs assistant coach Jason Fraser as the last player development assistant coach, being joined by fellow player development coach Irving Roland from the team's 2013–14 season.

On December 27, 2015, a day after losing to the Philadelphia 76ers (who before playing Phoenix had only one victory at that time and ended up with only 10 victories all season long), it was announced that both Earl Watson and Nate Bjorkgren were being promoted to full-time assistant coaches, while both long-time assistant coaches Jerry Sichting and Mike Longabardi were fired (although Longabardi was later hired by the Cleveland Cavaliers, eventually winning the 2016 NBA Finals six months later, while Sichting was reunite with Jeff Hornacek and Corey Gaines on the Knicks the next season). A month later, the Suns' head coach Jeff Hornacek was fired (although he'd find work again as the New York Knicks' head coach on May 18, 2016, while also being reunited with assistant coaches Jerry Sichting and Corey Gaines soon afterwards). Earl Watson became interim coach, replacing Hornacek. Former San Antonio Spurs and Seattle SuperSonics head coach Bob Hill became an assistant coach under Watson as the new head coach. After the season, the Suns designated Watson with the full-time head coach tag for the next three seasons.

Front office changes
On May 29, 2015, it was revealed that former Suns player and assistant coach Mark West was back in the front office role as a director of player relations and John Treloar was fired from his director of player personnel duties, as he decided to take on that same role for the Atlanta Hawks. Former president of basketball operations Lon Babby was relegated to be the team's senior adviser on June 10, 2015 after his initial contract as the team's president of basketball operations expired, although he still took part in the team's free agent decisions for the rest of June and July. As of August, however, that role was taken by general manager Ryan McDonough instead. On July 7, 2015, the Suns announced that the Los Angeles Clippers' Courtney Witte was the team's newest director of scouting. On July 30, 2015, Phoenix announced that the Bakersfield Jam's general manager Bubba Barrage was the new director of player personnel while keeping his role in Bakersfield, and Antonio Williams was the team's newest scout, replacing Ronnie Lester. Finally, on September 30, 2015, the team's strength and conditioning coach Mike Elliott was promoted to the director of performance.

Roster

Salaries

For the first time since the 2009–10 season, the Suns don't have to pay Josh Childress as the amnesty clause for the NBA expires. However, they still owe Michael Beasley $777,778 due to the buyout the Suns did on September 3, 2013. Beasley's contract still affects the Suns' salary for both this season and the next. Furthermore, the Suns also bought out Kris Humphries' contract on February 28, 2016, which removed his payments of around $3,440,000 from Phoenix's books in the current season, as well as payout the rest of Sonny Weems' $2,814,000 that he didn't get earlier on (which totals out to $660,000) for the rest of the season on March 5, 2016.

Pre-season
The six pre-season games the Suns played for this season tied the 1975–76 and 1981–82 seasons as the lowest number of pre-season games the Suns had in a season (excluding the lockout shortened pre-seasons of the 1998–99 and 2011–12 seasons).

|- style="background:#bfb;"
| 1
| October 7
| Sacramento
| 
| T. J. Warren, Jon Leuer (17)
| Jon Leuer (13)
| Eric Bledsoe, Ronnie Price (4)
| Talking Stick Resort Arena12,033
| 1–0
|- style="background:#bfb;"
| 2
| October 9
| Utah
| 
| Alex Len (21)
| Tyson Chandler, Sonny Weems (7)
| Brandon Knight (7)
| Talking Stick Resort Arena10,773
| 2–0
|- style="background:#fbb;"
| 3
| October 13
| Houston
| 
| T. J. Warren (21)
| Mirza Teletović (12)
| Markieff Morris, Sonny Weems (4)
| US Airways Center12,657
| 2–1
|- style="background:#fbb;"
| 4
| October 16
| @ Denver
| 
| Alex Len (14)
| Alex Len (8)
| Sonny Weems (8)
| Pepsi Center8,552
| 2–2
|- style="background:#bfb;"
| 5
| October 20
| @ San Antonio
| 
| Markieff Morris (17)
| Eric Bledsoe, Jon Leuer (8)
| Brandon Knight, T. J. Warren (7)
| AT&T Center15,774
| 3–2
|- style="background:#bfb;"
| 6
| October 21
| @ Dallas
| 
| Markieff Morris (18)
| T. J. Warren (8)
| Eric Bledsoe (7)
| American Airlines Center18,247
| 4–2

Regular season

Season standings

Game log

|- style="background:#fbb;"
| 1
| October 28
| Dallas
| 
| Brandon Knight (15)
| Alex Len (8)
| Eric Bledsoe (4)
| Talking Stick Resort Arena18,055
| 0–1
|- style="background:#bfb;"
| 2
| October 30
| Portland
| 
| Eric Bledsoe (22)
| Tyson Chandler (12)
| Brandon Knight (4)
| Talking Stick Resort Arena18,055
| 1–1
|- style="background:#bfb;"
| 3
| October 31
| @ Portland
| 
| Eric Bledsoe (33)
| Tyson Chandler (11)
| Eric Bledsoe (6)
| Moda Center17,906
| 2–1

|- style="background:#fbb;"
| 4
| November 2
| @ L.A. Clippers
| 
| Markieff Morris (19)
| Tyson Chandler (17)
| Brandon Knight (8)
| Staples Center19,060
| 2–2
|- style="background:#bfb;"
| 5
| November 4
| Sacramento
| 
| Eric Bledsoe (19)
| Tyson Chandler (11)
| Eric Bledsoe (8)
| Talking Stick Resort Arena16,497
| 3–2
|- style="background:#fbb;"
| 6
| November 6
| Detroit
| 
| Eric Bledsoe, Brandon Knight (22)
| Tyson Chandler, P. J. Tucker (10)
| Eric Bledsoe (4)
| Talking Stick Resort Arena16,676
| 3–3
|- style="background:#fbb;"
| 7
| November 8
| @ Oklahoma City
| 
| Eric Bledsoe (28)
| Tyson Chandler (8)
| Eric Bledsoe (11)
| Chesapeake Energy Arena18,203
| 3–4
|- style="background:#bfb;"
| 8
| November 12
| L.A. Clippers
| 
| Brandon Knight (37)
| Jon Leuer (11)
| Eric Bledsoe (9)
| Talking Stick Resort Arena17,204
| 4–4
|- style="background:#bfb;"
| 9
| November 14
| Denver
| 
| Eric Bledsoe (30)
| Mirza Teletović (9)
| Eric Bledsoe, P. J. Tucker (4)
| Talking Stick Resort Arena16,722
| 5–4
|- style="background:#bfb;"
| 10
| November 16
| L.A. Lakers
| 
| Brandon Knight (30)
| Brandon Knight (10)
| Brandon Knight (15)
| Talking Stick Resort Arena18,055
| 6–4
|- style="background:#fbb;"
| 11
| November 18
| Chicago
| 
| Brandon Knight (23)
| Tyson Chandler (9)
| Eric Bledsoe (7)
| Talking Stick Resort Arena17,377
| 6–5
|- style="background:#bfb;"
| 12
| November 20
| @ Denver
| 
| Brandon Knight (38)
| Brandon Knight (11)
| Brandon Knight (6)
| Pepsi Center12,264
| 7–5
|- style="background:#fbb;"
| 13
| November 22
| @ New Orleans
| 
| Eric Bledsoe (29)
| Tyson Chandler (10)
| Brandon Knight (7)
| Smoothie King Center16,680
| 7–6
|- style="background:#fbb;"
| 14
| November 23
| @ San Antonio
| 
| Markieff Morris (28)
| Markieff Morris (8)
| Brandon Knight (8)
| AT&T Center18,418
| 7–7
|- style="background:#fbb"
| 15
| November 25
| New Orleans
| 
| Brandon Knight (29)
| Jon Leuer (12)
| Brandon Knight (10)
| Talking Stick Resort Arena16,338
| 7–8
|- style="background:#fbb;"
| 16
| November 27
| Golden State
| 
| T. J. Warren (28)
| T. J. Warren (6)
| Eric Bledsoe (7)
| Talking Stick Resort Arena18,055
| 7–9
|- style="background:#bfb;"
| 17
| November 29
| @ Toronto
| 
| Eric Bledsoe, Mirza Teletović (20)
| T. J. Warren (11)
| Eric Bledsoe (11)
| Air Canada Centre19,800
| 8–9

|- style="background:#fbb;"
| 18
| December 1
| @ Brooklyn
| 
| Brandon Knight (26)
| Alex Len (14)
| Eric Bledsoe (7)
| Barclays Center12,787
| 8–10
|- style="background:#fbb;"
| 19
| December 2
| @ Detroit
| 
| Brandon Knight (22)
| Alex Len (7)
| Eric Bledsoe (9)
| The Palace of Auburn Hills13,985
| 8–11
|- style="background:#fbb;"
| 20
| December 4
| @ Washington
| 
| Eric Bledsoe (22)
| P. J. Tucker (13)
| Eric Bledsoe (7)
| Verizon Center17,255
| 8–12
|- style="background:#fbb;"
| 21
| December 6
| @ Memphis
| 
| Eric Bledsoe (23)
| Jon Leuer (11)
| Eric Bledsoe (6)
| FedExForum16,022
| 8–13
|- style="background:#bfb;"
| 22
| December 7
| @ Chicago
| 
| Brandon Knight (21)
| Eric Bledsoe (9)
| Devin Booker (5)
| United Center21,337
| 9–13
|- style="background:#bfb;"
| 23
| December 9
| Orlando
| 
| Eric Bledsoe, Brandon Knight (21)
| Alex Len (14)
| Eric Bledsoe (9)
| Talking Stick Resort Arena17,637
| 10–13
|- style="background:#fbb;"
| 24
| December 11
| Portland
| 
| Eric Bledsoe (31)
| Alex Len, Jon Leuer (8)
| Brandon Knight (10)
| Talking Stick Resort Arena17,028
| 10–14
|- style="background:#bfb;"
| 25
| December 13
| Minnesota
| 
| Brandon Knight (25)
| Alex Len, P. J. Tucker (7)
| Eric Bledsoe (9)
| Talking Stick Resort Arena16,919
| 11–14
|- style="background:#fbb;"
| 26
| December 14
| @ Dallas
| 
| Eric Bledsoe (23)
| Jon Leuer (13)
| Eric Bledsoe (7)
| American Airlines Center19,822
| 11–15
|- style="background:#fbb;"
| 27
| December 16
| @ Golden State
| 
| Mirza Teletović (24)
| T. J. Warren (8)
| Eric Bledsoe (8)
| Oracle Arena19,596
| 11–16
|- style="background:#bfb;"
| 28
| December 18
| New Orleans
| 
| Eric Bledsoe (29)
| Alex Len (13)
| Eric Bledsoe (9)
| Talking Stick Resort Arena17,227
| 12–16
|- style="background:#fbb;"
| 29
| December 20
| Milwaukee
| 
| Eric Bledsoe, T. J. Warren (18)
| Tyson Chandler, Alex Len (7)
| Brandon Knight, Markieff Morris (4)
| Talking Stick Resort Arena16,859
| 12–17
|- style="background:#fbb;"
| 30
| December 21
| @ Utah
| 
| Brandon Knight (26)
| Mirza Teletović (7)
| Eric Bledsoe (3)
| Vivint Smart Home Arena19,911
| 12–18
|- style="background:#fbb;"
| 31
| December 23
| Denver
| 
| Brandon Knight (21)
| P. J. Tucker (13)
| Brandon Knight (10)
| Talking Stick Resort Arena17,034
| 12–19
|- style="background:#fbb;"
| 32
| December 26
| Philadelphia
| 
| Brandon Knight (21)
| Tyson Chandler (10)
| Brandon Knight (7)
| Talking Stick Resort Arena17,548
| 12–20
|- style="background:#fbb;"
| 33
| December 28
| Cleveland
| 
| T. J. Warren (23)
| Tyson Chandler (8)
| Brandon Knight, Jon Leuer (4)
| Talking Stick Resort Arena18,319
| 12–21
|- style="background:#fbb;"
| 34
| December 30
| @ San Antonio
| 
| Tyson Chandler, Brandon Knight, T. J. Warren (11)
| Tyson Chandler (10)
| Markieff Morris (5)
| AT&T Center18,418
| 12–22
|- style="background:#fbb;"
| 35
| December 31
| @ Oklahoma City
| 
| P. J. Tucker (22)
| Tyson Chandler (10)
| Brandon Knight (6)
| Chesapeake Energy Arena18,203
| 12–23

|- style="background:#fbb;"
| 36
| January 2
| @ Sacramento
| 
| Brandon Knight (23)
| Brandon Knight, T. J. Warren (5)
| Brandon Knight, Ronnie Price (5)
| Sleep Train Arena17,317
| 12–24
|- style="background:#fbb;"
| 37
| January 3
| @ L.A. Lakers
| 
| Brandon Knight (25)
| Alex Len (9)
| Brandon Knight (9)
| Staples Center18,997
| 12–25
|- style="background:#bfb;"
| 38
| January 6
| Charlotte
| 
| Mirza Teletović (19)
| Devin Booker (10)
| Brandon Knight (7)
| Talking Stick Resort Arena16,910
| 13–25
|- style="background:#fbb;"
| 39
| January 8
| Miami
| 
| Brandon Knight (26)
| P. J. Tucker (11)
| Brandon Knight, Archie Goodwin (4)
| Talking Stick Resort Arena16,866
| 13–26
|- style="background:#fbb;"
| 40
| January 12
| @ Indiana
| 
| Devin Booker, Mirza Teletović (19)
| P. J. Tucker (10)
| P. J. Tucker, Lorenzo Brown (5)
| Bankers Life Fieldhouse15,284
| 13–27
|- style="background:#fbb;"
| 41
| January 15
| @ Boston
| 
| Mirza Teletović (22)
| Tyson Chandler, Markieff Morris (9)
| Sonny Weems (5)
| TD Garden18,624
| 13–28
|- style="background:#fbb;"
| 42
| January 17
| @ Minnesota
| 
| Brandon Knight (20)
| Tyson Chandler (8)
| P. J. Tucker (5)
| Target Center14,330
| 13–29
|- style="background:#fbb;"
| 43
| January 19
| Indiana
| 
| Devin Booker (32)
| Tyson Chandler (14)
| P. J. Tucker (5)
| Talking Stick Resort Arena16,802
| 13–30
|- style="background:#fbb;"
| 44
| January 21
| San Antonio
| 
| Devin Booker (24)
| Tyson Chandler (20)
| Devin Booker (5)
| Talking Stick Resort Arena16,779
| 13–31
|- style="background:#bfb;"
| 45
| January 23
| Atlanta
| 
| Archie Goodwin (24)
| Tyson Chandler (27)
| Tyson Chandler, Alex Len (5)
| Talking Stick Resort Arena17,034
| 14–31
|- style="background:#fbb;"
| 46
| January 26
| @ Philadelphia
| 
| Archie Goodwin (26)
| Alex Len (12)
| Devin Booker (7)
| Wells Fargo Center10,851
| 14–32
|- style="background:#fbb;"
| 47
| January 27
| @ Cleveland
| 
| Devin Booker (16)
| Tyson Chandler, P. J. Tucker (7)
| Devin Booker, Archie Goodwin (5)
| Quicken Loans Arena20,562
| 14–33
|- style="background:#fbb;"
| 48
| January 29
| @ New York
| 
| Devin Booker (21)
| Tyson Chandler (12)
| P. J. Tucker, Jordan McRae (4)
| Madison Square Garden19,812
| 14–34
|- style="background:#fbb;"
| 49
| January 31
| @ Dallas
| 
| Devin Booker (19)
| Tyson Chandler (13)
| Archie Goodwin, Markieff Morris (4)
| American Airlines Center20,137
| 14–35

|- style="background:#fbb;"
| 50
| February 2
| Toronto
| 
| Markieff Morris (30)
| Markieff Morris (11)
| Archie Goodwin (12)
| Talking Stick Resort Arena15,897
| 14–36
|- style="background:#fbb;"
| 51
| February 4
| Houston
| 
| Archie Goodwin (22)
| Alex Len (18)
| Archie Goodwin (7)
| Talking Stick Resort Arena15,723
| 14–37
|- style="background:#fbb;"
| 52
| February 6
| Utah
| 
| Devin Booker (18)
| Tyson Chandler (14)
| Markieff Morris (8)
| Talking Stick Resort Arena16,180
| 14–38
|- style="background:#fbb;"
| 53
| February 8
| Oklahoma City
| 
| Markieff Morris (23)
| Alex Len (8)
| Archie Goodwin (8)
| Talking Stick Resort Arena16,316
| 14–39
|- style="background:#fbb;"
| 54
| February 10
| Golden State
| 
| Archie Goodwin (25)
| Tyson Chandler (10)
| Devin Booker (10)
| Talking Stick Resort Arena18,055
| 14–40
|- align="center"
|colspan="9" bgcolor="#bbcaff"|All-Star Break
|- style="background:#fbb;"
| 55
| February 19
| Houston
| 
| Mirza Teletović (25)
| Kris Humphries (12)
| Archie Goodwin (4)
| Talking Stick Resort Arena17,102
| 14–41
|- style="background:#fbb;"
| 56
| February 21
| San Antonio
| 
| Alex Len (23)
| Alex Len (13)
| Devin Booker (6)
| Talking Stick Resort Arena16,224
| 14–42
|- style="background:#fbb;"
| 57
| February 22
| @ L.A. Clippers
| 
| Archie Goodwin (20)
| Alex Len (8)
| Phil Pressey (10)
| Staples Center19,060
| 14–43
|- style="background:#fbb;"
| 58
| February 25
| Brooklyn
| 
| Mirza Teletović (30)
| Tyson Chandler, Mirza Teletović (11)
| Phil Pressey (4)
| Talking Stick Resort Arena16,145
| 14–44
|- style="background:#bfb;"
| 59
| February 27
| Memphis
| 
| Alex Len (22)
| Alex Len (16)
| P. J. Tucker (7)
| Talking Stick Resort Arena17,101
| 15–44

|- style="background:#fbb;"
| 60
| March 1
| @ Charlotte
| 
| Alex Len (18)
| Alex Len (12)
| Phil Pressey, Ronnie Price (3)
| Time Warner Cable Arena16,849
| 15–45
|- style="background:#fbb;"
| 61
| March 3
| @ Miami
| 
| Devin Booker (34)
| Alex Len (13)
| Devin Booker (4)
| American Airlines Arena19,600
| 15–46
|- style="background:#bfb;"
| 62
| March 4
| @ Orlando
| 
| Alex Len (31)
| Alex Len (15)
| Devin Booker (6)
| Amway Center17,546
| 16–46
|- style="background:#bfb;"
| 63
| March 6
| @ Memphis
| 
| Devin Booker (27)
| Alex Len (16)
| Devin Booker (9)
| FedExForum17,291
| 17–46
|- style="background:#fbb;"
| 64
| March 9
| New York
| 
| Devin Booker (32)
| Alex Len (10)
| Ronnie Price (6)
| Talking Stick Resort Arena17,105
| 17–47
|- style="background:#fbb;"
| 65
| March 10
| @ Denver
| 
| Devin Booker (35)
| Alex Len (13)
| Brandon Knight, Devin Booker, Ronnie Price (5)
| Pepsi Center11,582
| 17–48
|- style="background:#fbb;"
| 66
| March 12
| @ Golden State
| 
| Brandon Knight (30)
| Alex Len (13)
| Devin Booker (11)
| Oracle Arena19,596
| 17–49
|- style="background:#bfb;"
| 67
| March 14
| Minnesota
| 
| P. J. Tucker (23)
| P. J. Tucker (12)
| Brandon Knight (7)
| Talking Stick Resort Arena17,480
| 18–49
|- style="background:#fbb;"
| 68
| March 17
| @ Utah
| 
| Brandon Knight (17)
| Alex Len (12)
| Devin Booker (3)
| Vivint Smart Home Arena18,784
| 18–50
|- style="background:#bfb;"
| 69
| March 18
| @ L.A. Lakers
| 
| Brandon Knight (22)
| Tyson Chandler (17)
| Devin Booker (7)
| Staples Center18,997
| 19–50
|- style="background:#fbb;"
| 70
| March 21
| Memphis
| 
| Devin Booker (18)
| Jon Leuer (13)
| Brandon Knight (7)
| Talking Stick Resort Arena15,868
| 19–51
|- style="background:#bfb;"
| 71
| March 23
| L.A. Lakers
| 
| Devin Booker (28)
| Jon Leuer (14)
| Brandon Knight, Devin Booker (7)
| Talking Stick Resort Arena18,191
| 20–51
|- style="background:#fbb;"
| 72
| March 25
| @ Sacramento
| 
| Devin Booker (26)
| P. J. Tucker, John Jenkins (8)
| Ronnie Price (5)
| Sleep Train Arena17,317
| 20–52
|- style="background:#fbb;"
| 73
| March 26
| Boston
| 
| Devin Booker (21)
| P. J. Tucker (10)
| P. J. Tucker (5)
| Talking Stick Resort Arena18,055
| 20–53
|- style="background:#fbb;"
| 74
| March 28
| @ Minnesota
| 
| Brandon Knight, Devin Booker (30)
| Alex Len (13)
| Brandon Knight, Devin Booker (5)
| Target Center11,141
| 20–54
|- style="background:#fbb;"
| 75
| March 30
| @ Milwaukee
| 
| P. J. Tucker (20)
| Alex Len (15)
| P. J. Tucker (7)
| BMO Harris Bradley Center15,733
| 20–55
|-

|- style="background:#fbb;"
| 76
| April 1
| Washington
| 
| Mirza Teletović (24)
| Tyson Chandler (14)
| Ronnie Price (8)
| Talking Stick Resort Arena17,345
| 20–56
|- style="background:#fbb;"
| 77
| April 3
| Utah
| 
| Mirza Teletović (24)
| Tyson Chandler (18)
| Devin Booker (7)
| Talking Stick Resort Arena17,279
| 20–57
|- style="background:#fbb;"
| 78
| April 5
| @ Atlanta
| 
| Devin Booker (34)
| Tyson Chandler (13)
| Ronnie Price (4)
| Philips Arena15,176
| 20–58
|- style="background:#bfb;"
| 79
| April 7
| @ Houston
| 
| Mirza Teletović (26)
| P. J. Tucker (12)
| Alex Len (7)
| Toyota Center18,227
| 21–58
|- style="background:#bfb;"
| 80
| April 9
| @ New Orleans
| 
| Archie Goodwin (24)
| Alex Len (11)
| Devin Booker (5)
| Smoothie King Center16,932
| 22–58
|- style="background:#fbb;"
| 81
| April 11
| Sacramento
| 
| Mirza Teletović (26)
| Alex Len (12)
| Ronnie Price (7)
| Talking Stick Resort Arena17,288
| 22–59
|- style="background:#bfb;"
| 82
| April 13
| L.A. Clippers
| 
| Mirza Teletović (22)
| Jon Leuer (14)
| Archie Goodwin (5)
| Talking Stick Resort Arena18,055
| 23–59

Player statistics

|- align="center" bgcolor=""
|
| 31 || 31 || 34.2 || .453 || .372 || .802 || 4.0 || 6.1 || 2.0 || 0.6 || 20.4
|- align="center" bgcolor="#f0f0f0"
|
| 76 || 51 || 27.7 || .423 || .343 || .840 || 2.5 || 2.6 || 0.6 || 0.3 || 13.8
|- align="center" bgcolor=""
|*
| 8 || 0 || 7.6 || .320 || .125 || .750 || 0.9 || 1.4 || 0.4 || 0.1 || 2.5
|- align="center" bgcolor="#f0f0f0"
|*
| 17 || 0 || 11.8 || .511 || .235 || .625 || 1.7 || 0.9 || 0.2 || 0.1 || 3.2
|- align="center" bgcolor=""
|
| 66 || 60 || 24.5 || .583 || .000 || .620 || 8.7 || 1.0 || 0.5 || 0.7 || 7.2
|- align="center" bgcolor="#f0f0f0"
|*
| 3 || 0 || 11.0 || .250 || .000 || .000 || 0.0 || 1.0 || 1.0 || 0.0 || 1.3
|- align="center" bgcolor=""
|
| 57 || 13 || 19.5 || .418 || .232 || .674 || 2.5 || 2.1 || 0.5 || 0.2 || 8.9
|- align="center" bgcolor="#f0f0f0"
|*
| 4 || 3 || 18.5 || .278 || .300 || .750 || 8.0 || 1.8 || 0.8 || 0.5 || 7.3
|- align="center" bgcolor=""
|*
| 8 || 0 || 6.3 || .409 || .000 || .667 || 2.0 || 0.0 || 0.0 || 0.1 || 2.8
|- align="center" bgcolor="#f0f0f0"
|*
| 22 || 2 || 13.0 || .467 || .406 || .800 || 1.6 || 1.2 || 0.2 || 0.0 || 5.0
|- align="center" bgcolor=""
|*
| 2 || 0 || 23.5 || .278 || .200 || .833 || 4.5 || 0.0 || 1.0 || 1.5 || 8.0
|- align="center" bgcolor="#f0f0f0"
|
| 52 || 50 || 36.0 || .415 || .342 || .852 || 3.9 || 5.1 || 1.2 || 0.4 || 19.6
|- align="center" bgcolor=""
|
| 78 || 46 || 23.3 || .423 || .143 || .728 || 7.6 || 1.2 || 0.5 || 0.8 || 9.0
|- align="center" bgcolor="#f0f0f0"
|
| 67 || 27 || 18.7 || .481 || .382 || .762 || 5.6 || 1.1 || 0.6 || 0.4 || 8.5
|- align="center" bgcolor=""
|*
| 7 || 0 || 11.7 || .423 || .273 || .533 || 1.1 || 1.4 || 0.4 || 0.0 || 5.3
|- align="center" bgcolor="#f0f0f0"
|*
| 37 || 24 || 24.8 || .397 || .289 || .717 || 5.2 || 2.4 || 0.9 || 0.5 || 11.6
|- align="center" bgcolor=""
|*
| 9 || 0 || 12.6 || .391 || .000 || .571 || 0.9 || 3.2 || 0.8 || 0.3 || 2.4
|- align="center" bgcolor="#f0f0f0"
|
| 62 || 18 || 19.5 || .384 || .347 || .756 || 1.6 || 2.4 || 1.2 || 0.2 || 5.3
|- align="center" bgcolor=""
|
| 79 || 1 || 21.3 || .427 || .393 || .774 || 3.8 || 1.1 || 0.4 || 0.3 || 12.2
|- align="center" bgcolor="#f0f0f0"
|
| 82 || 80 || 31.0 || .411 || .330 || .746 || 6.2 || 2.2 || 1.3 || 0.2 || 8.0
|- align="center" bgcolor=""
|
| 47 || 4 || 22.8 || .501 || .400 || .703 || 3.1 || 0.9 || 0.8 || 0.3 || 11.0
|- align="center" bgcolor="#f0f0f0"
|*
| 36 || 0 || 11.7 || .393 || .406 || .538 || 1.1 || 1.3 || 0.3 || 0.0 || 2.5
|- align="center" bgcolor=""
|
| 10 || 0 || 6.8 || .417 || .000 || .643 || 3.8 || 0.5 || 0.4 || 0.5 || 2.9
|-
|}

 Stats with the Suns

Injuries/Personal missed games

Awards, records, and milestones

Awards
T. J. Warren earned All-NBA First Team Las Vegas Summer League Honors due to his overall performance throughout the 2015 NBA Summer League.
Two-time MVP point guard Steve Nash had his number placed in the Phoenix Suns Ring of Honor on October 30, 2015 against the Portland Trail Blazers. The Suns won that game by the score of 110–92, thus blowing out the Trail Blazers in the process.
Former Suns player Shaquille O'Neal was named to the Naismith Memorial Basketball Hall of Fame on April 4, 2016 around the 2016 NCAA Finals between Villanova and North Carolina.
Devin Booker earned himself NBA All-Rookie First Team honors as the considered third-best player for that team after also earning fourth place for NBA Rookie of the Year Award honors.

Week/Month
Alex Len was named a Player of The Week candidate for the Western Conference from February 29 – March 6, 2016 for averaging 20 points, 14 rebounds, 1.3 blocks, and 10 free throw attempts per game during that streak.
Devin Booker was named the runner-up for the Rookie of The Month award in March for his consistent performances throughout that month, which includes him leading all rookies in points and assists made that month.

All-Star
Jordan McRae was announced as a competitor in the NBA Development League All-Star Game on the same day he signed a 10-day contract with the team (January 29, 2016).
Likewise, both former Suns player Lorenzo Brown and future Suns player Orlando Johnson (he signed on February 5, 2016) were also announced as competitors on that same day.
Jordan McRae scored 7 points and put up 5 assists as his team (the Eastern Conference) beat the Western Conference 128–124. Neither former player Lorenzo Brown nor Jordan's then-current teammate, Orlando Johnson, played in the event.
Rookie Devin Booker was a competitor for the Three-Point Shootout on February 1, 2016. That made Booker the youngest player to ever participate in the Three-Point Contest, at 19 years old, beating the record set by Bradley Beal at 20 years old in 2014.
In Booker's first ever performance in the contest, he scored 20 points in the first round (tying for third-place), beating James Harden and JJ Redick with 12 points in the tiebreaker round before finishing in third place overall with 16 points behind the Splash Brothers (with Klay Thompson winning by 27 points, tying the record set by his teammate Stephen Curry a year earlier).
Devin Booker was announced as a participant for the NBA Cares Special Olympics Unified Basketball Game for the 2016 All-Star game alongside former Suns player Steve Nash on February 10, 2016.
Rookie Devin Booker competed in the Rising Stars Challenge on February 11, 2016 (a day before the event began) due to Philadelphia 76ers power forward/center Nerlens Noel injuring his right knee before the event began.
During his time there, Booker scored 23 points for Team U.S.A. (with 18 in the first half) as the road Team U.S.A. would be the home World Team 157–154, with the home and road team roles being reversed this time due to the All-Star Game being played in Canada this season.
Jon Leuer was a competitor for the All-Star Game's Talent Competition. He did not win the event.

Records
Brandon Knight became the youngest player to record a stat line of 30 points, 15 assists, 10 rebounds, and 4 steals in a single NBA game on November 16, 2015 against the Los Angeles Lakers by doing it while he was  old. Knight also became the second Suns player to record a triple-double of 30 points, 15 assists, and 10 rebounds (the first was former All-Star Charlie Scott), as well as the ninth player to record such statistics and only the fourth player (behind Pete Maravich, Magic Johnson, and Russell Westbrook) to record the same stats with four steals. Furthermore, Knight was also the first player since Michael Jordan in 1985 to record a statline similar to the 30 points, 15 assists, and 10 rebounds that Knight had for their first ever triple-double in the league.
Devin Booker became the youngest guard in NBA history to record a double-double in points and rebounds instead of through points and assists with the 17 points and 10 rebounds he recorded on January 6, 2016 against the Charlotte Hornets.
He also became the youngest player in NBA history to record 10 rebounds as a reserve player off the bench.
Rookie Devin Booker also became the youngest guard ever to have four games of at least 27 points and 5 assists, as well as the only guard throughout the entire NBA to record such numbers before turning 20 years old.
Mirza Teletović recorded the highest number of three-pointers made by a reserve player on April 5, 2016 against the Atlanta Hawks. Mirza tied the record by the end of the first quarter on that game, and broke the record set by Chuck Person for the San Antonio Spurs during the 1994–95 season in the second quarter with 8:42 left to go.
He ended the season with a record-high 179 three-pointers made off the bench, making thirteen more three-pointers in the last four games of April, three of which were victories.
The record was later broken next season by Eric Gordon as a member of the Houston Rockets.

Team records
Devin Booker was the team's youngest ever selection (at the time) in the NBA draft, being  old at the time of his selection on June 25, 2015. Booker also ended up being one of the youngest players to ever play in the NBA by remaining 18 years old due to him playing two days before his 19th birthday, in which the earliest time he could play in the regular season (and the only time before his 19th birthday took place) was the October 28, 2015 home game against the Dallas Mavericks. He became the second Suns player to play before his 18th birthday while debuting with the team (the Polish/Swedish forward-center Maciej Lampe made his debut with the Suns 13 days before his birthday during the 2003–04 season despite originally being drafted by the New York Knicks in the second round around that time).
The 142 points the Sacramento Kings scored on January 2, 2016 was the highest against Phoenix without the help of an overtime since the 1990–91 NBA season.
The 22 points scored in the first half of the road game against the Los Angeles Lakers on January 3, 2016 was the franchise's lowest-scoring half ever, beating out the 24 point half set a year earlier at home against the San Antonio Spurs.
Devin Booker became the youngest Suns player in history to record his first ever double-double with the team by producing 17 points and 10 rebounds in a 111–102 victory over the Charlotte Hornets on January 6, 2016.
Lorenzo Brown scored 7 points in his debut with the Suns on January 12, 2016 against the Indiana Pacers. It made him the highest scoring player on the team during a first game on a 10-day contract.
Jordan McRae broke that record on January 29, 2016 against the New York Knicks by scoring 12 points off the bench.
Devin Booker became the youngest Suns player to record 30 or more points by scoring 32 points in a close loss to the Indiana Pacers on January 19, 2016, beating out fan favorite Amar'e Stoudemire at 20 years old (albeit with 38 points). Booker also had the highest number of three-pointers made in a single game for the Suns with six.
Tyson Chandler tied the team record for most rebounds recorded in a single game (27) that was initially set by Paul Silas on January 18, 1971 against the Cleveland Cavaliers, and broke the Suns' record for most offensive rebounds by a single player with 13 (the previous best high was 12 with both Charles Barkley and Curtis Perry) in a close 98–95 victory over the Atlanta Hawks>  He also became the first Suns player to record consecutive 20+ rebounding games (he'd also record 20 rebounds in a loss to the San Antonio Spurs on January 21, 2016).
Archie Goodwin broke the record set by star point guard Kevin Johnson in the 1987–88 season as the youngest player in Suns history to record a double-double in points and assists by scoring 18 points and putting up 12 assists on February 2, 2016 against the Toronto Raptors.
Rookie Devin Booker broke that record over a week later on February 10, 2016, with 15 points and 10 assists (as well as 7 rebounds) in a close loss to the defending champion Golden State Warriors. He also became the youngest Suns player to record multiple double-doubles during the regular season, beating out Amar'e Stoudemire in his rookie season. Furthermore, Booker became the second-youngest player behind LeBron James to record a point-assist double-double (beating the Golden State Warriors' Shaun Livingston) and becoming only the third player to record similar statistics at age 19 behind only James and former Suns player Stephon Marbury, as well as the first Suns rookie since Steve Nash in the 1996–97 season to record a point-assist double-double with the team.
Phil Pressey became the shortest player in franchise history to record 3 or more blocks in a single game, as well as the most blocks by a point guard in his debut on February 21, 2016, against the San Antonio Spurs.
Alex Len became the first player at 22 years old to ever record a game of 19 points, 16 rebounds, and 6 assists for the Suns in the 109–100 victory on March 6, 2016 against the Memphis Grizzlies.
The 69 points the Suns recorded against the Utah Jazz on St. Patrick's Day of 2016 tied the lowest number of points scored in a single game for the Suns, with them also recording 69 points on April 7, 2015, against the Atlanta Hawks and on February 10, 2013, against the Oklahoma City Thunder.
Mirza Teletović becomes the newest team record holder for three-pointers made off the bench for the Suns by him making at least 151 three-pointers (done by making 5 of them in a victory on Kobe Bryant's last game against the Suns on March 23, 2016) over the 150 three-pointers made by Danny Ainge during the 1992–93 season.
By extension, he later broke the NBA record set by former San Antonio Spurs player Chuck Person during the 1994–95 season by making at least 165 three-pointers (with three made in a loss to the Atlanta Hawks on April 5, 2016) throughout the season.
Mirza ended the season with a season-high 179 three-pointers made off the bench.
Devin Booker had the longest streak of making at least one three-pointer in a stretch of 14 games, which was also the longest stretch by a rookie in Suns Franchise history.

Milestones
Devin Booker became the first ever player to make his NBA debut at 18 years old while also previously playing at least one year in college.
He also became the seventh-youngest player to score 10 or more points in his rookie season, behind only Amir Johnson, Andrew Bynum, Tracy McGrady, Bill Willoughby, LeBron James, Dwight Howard, and Kobe Bryant by scoring 14 points on his opening night debut against the Dallas Mavericks. Furthermore, he also became the fourth player to score 10 or more points during their professional debuts in the NBA as an 18-year-old, joining the likes of Jonathan Bender, LeBron James, and Dwight Howard in the process.
Devin Booker became the sixth-youngest player to record multiple games of 19 or more points scored during their rookie season after first scoring 19 against the Philadelphia 76ers on December 26, 2015 and then scoring 21 points against the Sacramento Kings on January 2, 2016, behind only Kevin Durant, Dwight Howard, LeBron James, Tracy McGrady, and Kobe Bryant.
Jeff Hornacek got his 100th victory as a head coach on January 6, 2016 against the Charlotte Hornets.
Ann Meyers Drysdale and Stephanie Ready marked the first time in NBA history that two female announcers from different teams were analysts for their respective teams (Ann for Phoenix, Stephanie for Charlotte) on January 6, 2016.
In that same game, Devin Booker became the fifth-youngest player to record a double-double in the NBA, behind only Michael Kidd-Gilchrist, Giannis Antetokounmpo, Andrew Bynum, and LeBron James.
On January 19, 2016, Devin Booker became the sixth-youngest player to record multiple games of scoring 20 or more points as a rookie, and became the third-youngest player in league history to score over 30 points in a single game, behind only Kevin Durant and LeBron James.
On January 19 & 21, 2016, Devin Booker became the first teenage rookie since Kevin Durant back in the 2007–08 season (back when Kevin was playing for the Seattle SuperSonics instead of the Oklahoma City Thunder) to score 54 or more points in consecutive games with Devin scoring 32 points against the Indiana Pacers and 24 points against the San Antonio Spurs.
On February 21, 2016, new Suns point guard Phil Pressey recorded three blocked shots in his first game with Phoenix against the San Antonio Spurs. Pressey was the first player less than 6' tall to record at least three blocks in a single game since Nate Robinson in 2013.
Rookie Devin Booker became only the second player this season, after former Kentucky teammate Karl-Anthony Towns to record multiple games of 32+ points in his rookie season, with 32 points at home against the Indiana Pacers in January and 34 points on the road against the Miami Heat in March. He was also the fourth-youngest rookie to record multiple games of 30 or more points in a season, after Kobe Bryant, Kevin Durant, and LeBron James.
Tyson Chandler overtook Elton Brand on the List of National Basketball Association career rebounding leaders board with 12 rebounds against the Orlando Magic compared to Brand's four against the Miami Heat on March 4, 2016 to make him the newest 50th best rebounder of all-time with 8,986 rebounds against the 8,981 rebounds for Brand (and he also overtook Larry Bird's spot in the process).
Tyson Chandler became the 50th player in league history to record over 9,000 rebounds in a career by recording 9 rebounds on March 9, 2016 against the New York Knicks.
Devin Booker became the fourth rookie to record at least 3 games of recording 27 points and 5 assists as a teenager, thus joining LeBron James, Carmelo Anthony, and former Suns player Stephon Marbury.
He later became only the second player in league history (after LeBron James with 22 games) to record at least four or more games of 27 points and 5 assists as teenagers during their rookie seasons in the NBA.
He also became only the second guard behind Stephon Marbury to record multiple games of 30 points and 5 assists during their rookie season before the age of 20, and one of seven guards to record at least one game of 30 points and 5 assists before the age of 21.
Rookie Devin Booker became the second rookie ever (after LeBron James) to record two straight 30+ games in a row by recording 32 points against the New York Knicks and a new career-high 35 points against the Denver Nuggets on March 9 & 10, 2016. He's also the second-youngest rookie to have done it for two straight days in a row.
Devin Booker became the fifth-youngest player to record around 900 points during a  rookie season and the sixth-youngest player to do it before turning 20 years old, and the seventh player overall behind LeBron James, Dwight Howard, Kobe Bryant, Kevin Durant, Carmelo Anthony, and Tracy McGrady to record 900 points in the NBA while still being a teenager.
Devin Booker became the second-youngest rookie to ever record 11 assists in at least one game on March 12, 2016 against the defending champion Golden State Warriors, being behind only LeBron James, who did it twice.
Devin Booker became the first rookie since Stephen Curry in the 2009–10 season (or Blake Griffin in the 2010–11 season if you exclude the fact that his original rookie season had him out for that entire season due to a knee injury and that his second season is technically his rookie season now) to record 6 different 30+ point games during his rookie season.
Center Tyson Chandler overtook power forward/center Johnny Green to become the 49th best rebounder of all-time on April 1, 2016 at home against Markieff Morris and the Washington Wizards. He'd tie Johnny's mark by grabbing his 7th rebound with about 4 minutes left in the second quarter off of a Marcin Gortat miss and then grab his 8th rebound to surpass Johnny Green's mark less than a minute later. He'd end up with a game-high 15 rebounds in a 106–99 loss to the Wizards that night.
Devin Booker recorded the fourth-highest 30+ point games during a rookie season (with six games) while still a teenager, behind only LeBron James, Kevin Durant, and Carmelo Anthony.
Devin Booker became the fourth-youngest player to record over 1,000 points during a rookie season (behind only LeBron James and Kevin Durant), as well the fourth-youngest player overall (with Kobe Bryant joining the list when including his second season in the NBA). He also became the sixth player to record over 1,000 points in the NBA as a teenager, during the 121–100 blowout victory over the New Orleans Pelicans on April 9, 2016.

Team milestones
The signing of Tyson Chandler marked the first time (excluding Ben Wallace's temporary move to Phoenix back in June 2009 in order to trade away star center Shaquille O'Neal) that the Suns had gotten a Defensive Player of the Year winner — current or former — to become a part of their roster.
The Suns won three straight games by 14 or more points, from November 12–16. It was the first time the Suns won three straight games by such a wide margin of victory since the 2009–10 season.
Brandon Knight recorded the most 30+ point games for the Suns in their first twelve games of the regular season since Amar'e Stoudemire back in the 2004–05 Phoenix Suns season.
Tyson Chandler recorded multiple games of at least 20 rebounds on January 21 and 23, 2016 (including a record-high tying 27 rebounds against the Atlanta Hawks), thus making him the first player to ever record such a feat with the Phoenix Suns.
Markieff Morris surpassed former Suns shooting guard Joe Johnson to become the Suns' newest 30th best scorer in team history on February 2, 2016 (which was also interim head coach Earl Watson's debut in coaching the Suns). He scored his 3,848th point by successfully completing a three-point dunk (as in making a regular dunk with an extra free-throw to add onto it) with 5:20 left in the first quarter. Morris scored 14 points in the first quarter and over 30 points in the game (as well as having 11 rebounds and 6 assists) in a loss to the Raptors.
Markieff Morris overtook former forward Cedric Ceballos as the new 29th best scorer in Suns history on February 8, 2016 against the Oklahoma City Thunder. Morris scored a game-high 23 points, including making a turnaround jump shot (with a foul for an extra free-throw) to surpass Cedric in the fourth quarter in a loss to the Thunder.
Markieff Morris then surpassed former center James Edwards as the Suns' newest 28th best scorer in team history two days later against the defending champion Golden State Warriors. He scored his 14th point by making a jump shot early in the third quarter and recorded a total of 19 points in a loss against Golden State.
Devin Booker became the first Suns rookie to record multiple double-doubles in a season since Amar'e Stoudemire during the 2002–03 season on the same February 10, 2016 game against the Warriors (by recording 15 points, 10 assists, and even 7 rebounds) after he recorded his first double-double a month earlier (with 17 points and 10 rebounds) against the Charlotte Hornets.
Mirza Teletović was the first player since Amar'e Stoudemire back in the 2009–10 season to record 30 points and 11 rebounds in a single game on February 25, 2016 against his former team, the Brooklyn Nets.
The February 25 and 27 home games against the Brooklyn Nets and Memphis Grizzlies marked the first time the Suns had three players recording double-digit rebounds in multiple games, with Mirza Teletović, Tyson Chandler, and Kris Humphries doing it against Brooklyn and Tyson Chandler, P. J. Tucker. and Alex Len doing it against Memphis, since March 31 and April 1, 2008, both of which were against the Denver Nuggets.
Devin Booker became the first rookie since Richard Dumas from the 1992–93 season to record multiple games of 30+ points in his rookie season after recording a new (at the time) career-high 34 points on March 3, 2016 in a loss against the Miami Heat to go with the 32 points he'd score earlier in a close loss to the Indiana Pacers. He'd also join former players Cedric Ceballos twice and eventual Phoenix Suns Ring of Honor players Alvan Adams three times and Walter Davis twelve different times as the only other rookies to score 32 or more points for the team in their rookie seasons.
Devin Booker had at least five games of 32 or more points (six for 30 or more points) to close out the season, thus making him the second-highest rookie to score 32 or more points during their rookie season.
Alex Len became the 100th player in franchise history to score over 1,000 points for the Suns with his 31 points he'd record in a blowout 102–94 victory over the Orlando Magic on March 4, 2016. Furthermore, he became the second-youngest Suns player to ever record a 30+ points and 15+ rebounds (the youngest Suns player to do it was Amar'e Stoudemire four different times), as well as become the first Suns player since Stoudemire in the 2009–10 season to record such numbers for the team.
From February 27 to March 6, 2016, Alex Len recorded five straight double-doubles of various performances. This was the longest streak since Shawn Marion with 11 straight double-doubles during the 2000–01 season (with Len being about 70 days younger than Marion at the time). In addition, Len had the longest streak of double-doubles with 12 or more points and rebounds of five games since Shawn Marion in the 2005–06 season, as well as become the first Suns player since Marcin Gortat in the lockout-shortened 2011–12 season to record five straight double-doubles involving points and rebounds.
The March 6, 2016 performance where rookie Devin Booker had 27 points and 9 assists in a 109–100 victory over the Memphis Grizzlies made him the first Suns rookie since Michael Finley during his only full season with the Suns in 1996 to record a similar statline in a game, as well as one of six players alongside LeBron James, Kyrie Irving, former Suns player Stephon Marbury, Carmelo Anthony, and Kevin Durant to record such a line while still being a teenager in the NBA.
The March 9 and 10, 2016 games against the New York Knicks and the Denver Nuggets, respectively, became the first time a Suns player (rookie Devin Booker) had back-to-back 30+ point games in a season since Amar'e Stoudemire back in 2010.
Furthermore, the 35-point performance against the Denver Nuggets made Devin Booker the youngest player to ever have a 35-point game against another NBA team, beating out Amar'e Stoudemire during his rookie season back when he was 20 years old.
In the February and March games against the defending champion Golden State Warriors, Devin Booker had two different double-doubles with 15 points and 10 assists (with 7 rebounds) on the February 10th game and then put up 18 points and a new season-high 11 assists on the March 12th game. As a result, Devin Booker became the first Suns rookie since Negele Knight in the 1990–91 season to record multiple games involving double-doubles for points and assists.
Furthermore, the game on March where he had 11 assists against Golden State was the highest number of assists in Suns history for a rookie, beating out the record that was set by teammate Archie Goodwin during the 2013–14 season.
From February 28 to March 17, 2016, Alex Len recorded a career-high (at this time) 10 straight games of 10 or more rebounds. It was the most recorded under a single stretch of time since Marcin Gortat did it under the lockout 2011–12 season, and he was the youngest player to ever record 10 or more games of 10 or more rebounds for the Suns since Shawn Marion during the 2000–01 season.
The four games in which rookie Devin Booker recorded 30 or more points for the month of March was the first time since Amar'e Stoudemire in March 2010 that a Suns player had four or more games with 30 or more points against an opponent.
Devin Booker became only the fifth rookie in Suns history to record at least 900 points in franchise history behind only Amar'e Stoudemire, Michael Finley, Walter Davis, and Alvan Adams, and the youngest player in franchise history to do so.
The 22.4 points that Devin Booker recorded was the highest for a Suns rookie in the month of March since Walter Davis averaged 25.1 points per game in March 1978.
The March 30 and April 1, 2016 games resulted in the first time three different Suns players got three points/rebounds double-double in multiple games since Tom Chambers, Dan Majerle, and Mark West did it back in 1989. Centers Alex Len and Tyson Chandler, as well as small forward P. J. Tucker recorded their double-doubles on the March 30 game against the Milwaukee Bucks, while center Tyson Chandler, small forward P. J. Tucker, and power forward Mirza Teletović recorded theirs in Markieff Morris' debut against the Suns as an opponent on April 1 against the Washington Wizards.
Devin Booker became the youngest player in franchise history to record over 1,000 points as a rookie, beating out the record set by Amar'e Stoudemire, who had gone straight out of high school to play in the NBA. He recorded his 1,000th point on April 9, 2016 with 10:51 left in the first quarter against the New Orleans Pelicans and finished with 16 points in a blowout 121–100 victory over the New Orleans Pelicans. He also became the fifth player in franchise history behind Alvan Adams, Walter Davis, Michael Finley, and Amar'e Stoudemire to record over 1,000 points for the Suns during their rookie seasons.
Mirza Teletović tied Eddie Johnson for the most 20+ point games coming off the bench in the month of April with 6 games since the 1983–84 season. He also tied both Isaiah Thomas and Joe Johnson with four straight games of 20+ point outings coming off the bench since the 2000–01 season.
Alan Williams became the sixth rookie to record a double-double for the Suns during their first 10 games of their rookie season. He'd join the likes of Markieff Morris, Shawn Marion, Steve Nash, Armen Gilliam, and Georgi Glouchkov since the 1983–84 season by recording a double-double of 14 points and 12 rebounds during the last game of the season with a 114–105 victory over the Los Angeles Clippers on April 13, 2016.
Devin Booker recorded the highest scoring averages of any Suns rookie since Michael Finley during the 1995–96 season.
Devin Booker had the highest number of votes ever for a Suns player in the NBA Rookie of The Year Award voting since Amar'e Stoudemire won the award over #1 draft pick and eventual Hall of Famer Yao Ming in 2003.
Devin Booker became the first Sun to make it to the NBA All-Rookie First Team since the soon-to-be former NBA player Amar'e Stoudemire last did it in 2003.

Transactions

Trades

Free agents

Re-signed

Additions

Subtractions

See also
2015–16 NBA season

References

Phoenix Suns seasons
Phoenix Suns
Phoenix Suns
Phoenix Suns